Elizabeth and Malcolm Chace Wellness and Athletic Center is a multi-purpose arena in Smithfield, Rhode Island. It is home to the Bryant University Bulldogs men's and women's basketball teams as well as the women's volleyball team.

The venue received additions in the 2000s and 2010s under Bryant President Ronald Machtley and athletic director Bill Smith. Its current capacity is 2,000 with upgrades that include over 650 chairback seats opposite the team benches in 2018.

The 2018 upgrades also included new basketball locker rooms, a press conference room, and improved locker rooms for Bryant's swimming & diving programs, whose pool is connected to the original structure with the Chace gym.

The Chace became infamous following a brawl between fans of Wagner College and Bryant in the 2022 Northeast Conference men's basketball tournament . The fight resulted in a 30 minute suspension of play during the game.

See also
 List of NCAA Division I basketball arenas

References

External links
Venue information

Bryant Bulldogs men's basketball
Bryant Bulldogs women's basketball
College basketball venues in the United States
Sports venues in Rhode Island
Indoor arenas in Rhode Island
Sports venues in Providence County, Rhode Island